Manzuma nigritibiis is a species of jumping spider in the family Salticidae. It is found in Ethiopia and Yemen.

References

Spiders described in 1994
Spiders of the Arabian Peninsula
Salticidae
Taxa named by Wanda Wesołowska